Hastings Municipal Airport  is two miles northwest of Hastings in Adams County, Nebraska. The National Plan of Integrated Airport Systems for 2011–2015 categorized it as a "general aviation" airport.

The first airline flights were Mid-West Airlines Cessna 190s in 1950-51. Frontier DC-3s arrived in 1959 and its last Convair 580s left in 1979.

Facilities
The airport covers 504 acres (204 ha) at an elevation of 1,961 feet (598 m). It has two concrete runways: 14/32 is 6,451 by 100 feet (1,966 x 30 m) and 4/22 is 4,501 by 75 feet (1,372 x 23 m).

In the year ending June 23, 2010 the airport had 19,000 aircraft operations, average 52 per day: 96% general aviation, 3% air taxi, and 1% military. 25 aircraft were then based at this airport: 84% single-engine and 16% multi-engine.

References

External links 
 
 Hastings (HSI) from the Nebraska Department of Aeronautics
 Aerial image as of April 1999 from USGS The National Map
 

Airports in Nebraska
Buildings and structures in Adams County, Nebraska
Transportation in Adams County, Nebraska